The Dowd Report is the document describing the transgressions of baseball player and manager Pete Rose in betting on baseball, which precipitated his agreement to a permanent ban from the sport in the United States. The 225-page report was prepared by Special Counsel to the Commissioner John M. Dowd and was submitted to Commissioner Bart Giamatti in May 1989. The report, published in June 1989, was accompanied by seven volumes of exhibits, which included bank and telephone records, alleged betting records, expert reports, and transcripts of interviews with Rose and other witnesses.

Rose was ultimately placed on baseball's ineligible list in August 1989. The most controversial conclusion of the report, that Rose had bet on baseball games while managing the Cincinnati Reds, was confirmed 15 years later by Rose himself through his autobiography My Prison Without Bars.

Dowd later donated the Dowd Report collections to his alma mater, Emory University School of Law, in 2015.

References

External links

 Dowd Report in PDF
 Sean Lahman's Pete Rose FAQ - links to related content about the Dowd Report
 "Evaluating the Dowd Report" at Baseball Prospectus
 The Dowd Report-Pete Rose’s Ban from Baseball: 25 Years Later from YouTube

Cincinnati Reds
History of Major League Baseball
Major League Baseball controversies
Sports betting scandals
1989 Major League Baseball season